Andrew Oliver Mungo Wilkie (born 14 September 1959)  is a clinical geneticist who has been the Nuffield professor of Pathology at the University of Oxford since 2003.

Education
Wilkie was educated at Arnold House School, Westminster School and Trinity College, Cambridge, where he was awarded a Bachelor of Arts degree in 1980 and a Master of Arts degree in 1984. He moved to Merton College, Oxford, where he was awarded a Bachelor of Medicine, Bachelor of Surgery degree in 1983 and subsequently a Doctor of Medicine degree in 1992.

Research
Wilkie's research investigates genetic disorders affecting the skull and limbs, especially craniosynostosis – premature fusion of the sutures of the skull. He identified the gene mutation responsible for Apert syndrome and the molecular pathways underlying this and other craniosynostosis conditions. These results have led to many clinical diagnostic tests.

Wilkie's discovery that the mutation causing Apert syndrome was more common than expected led him to develop the 'selfish selection' theory, which states that there is a proliferation or survival advantage for some mutations in the testis. Over time, sperm-generating cells carrying such mutations become prevalent, explaining why some conditions are more common in children born to older fathers.

Wilkie demonstrated that the Ras molecular pathway, the common factor in paternal age effect conditions, is also important in the development of nerves and tumours. Consequently, his work has implications for other diseases, including autism and cancer. His research has been funded by the Medical Research Council (MRC). His former postdoctoral students include Anne Goriely.

Awards and honours
Wilkie was elected a Fellow of the Academy of Medical Sciences (FMedSci) in 2002, the European Molecular Biology Organization (EMBO) in 2006 and a Fellow of the Royal Society (FRS) in 2013.

Personal life
Wilkie is the son of Douglas Robert Wilkie FRS.

References

1959 births
Fellows of the Royal Society
Members of the European Molecular Biology Organization
Fellows of the Academy of Medical Sciences (United Kingdom)
Living people